Northampton County Public Schools is a school district headquartered in Machipongo, Virginia, serving Northampton County.

Schools
The schools in this district are:

Elementary schools:
Kiptopeke Elementary School
Occohannock Elementary School

Middle schools:
Northampton Middle School

High schools:
Northampton High School

References

External links
 Northampton County Public Schools
 

School divisions in Virginia